Catallactics is a theory of the way the free market system reaches exchange ratios and prices.  It aims to analyse all actions based on monetary calculation and trace the formation of prices back to the point where an agent makes his or her choices. It explains prices as they are, rather than as they "should" be. The laws of catallactics are not value judgments, but aim to be exact, empirical, and of universal validity. It was used extensively by the Austrian School economist Ludwig von Mises.

Catallactics is a praxeological theory. The term catallaxy was used by Friedrich Hayek to describe "the order brought about by the mutual adjustment of many individual economies in a market." Hayek was dissatisfied with the usage of the word "economy" because its Greek root, which translates as "household management", implies that economic agents in a market economy possess shared goals. He derived the word "Catallaxy" (Hayek's suggested Greek construction would be rendered καταλλαξία) from the Greek verb katallasso (καταλλάσσω) which meant not only "to exchange" but also "to admit in the community" and "to change from enemy into friend."

According to Mises (Human Action, p. 3) and Hayek it was Richard Whately who coined the term "catallactics". Whately's Introductory Lectures on Political Economy (1831) reads:

See also 
Price signal

Notes

Austrian School
Friedrich Hayek
Self-organization